The Red Hook Houses are two connected public housing complexes located in Red Hook, Brooklyn, New York City. Managed by the New York City Housing Authority (NYCHA), they comprise the largest housing development in Brooklyn.

The Red Hook Houses are composed of Red Hook East and Red Hook West. Red Hook East is composed of 16 residential buildings and 3 non-residential buildings with 1,411 total units and 3,001 residents. Red Hook West is composed of 14 residential buildings and one non-residential building with 1,480 total units and 3,289 residents. The buildings are 2 and 6-stories tall.

History

Development 
Land for the Red Hook Houses was acquired by condemnation starting in May 1938. The Red Hook Houses were designed by architect Alfred Easton Poor with landscaping by Charles N. Lowrie. Construction was completed on the 40-acre, $13 million project on November 20, 1939. Upon completion, the development was heralded as a modern living residence with fireproofing; modern kitchen, bathroom, and laundry facilities; vermin-proof; and open to light.

In 1940, Marion Greenwood was commissioned by the Federal Art Project to paint frescoes for the Red Hook Houses. The  piece, located in the lobby, was titled Blueprint for Living and was intended to express optimism for a more harmonious future for residents. Eleanor Roosevelt toured the development, seeing Greenwood at work, and gave a speech entitled “Restoring Community Life Through Planned Housing Development.”

Later years 
On December 17, 1992, P.S. 15 principal Patrick Daly was murdered when he walked into the crossfire looking for a student who left the school after a fight at the Red Hook Houses. The residents of the houses and school were shocked by the principal's death, and a 17-year-old suspect was later arrested and charged with killing Daly. After the death, undercover police officers began patrolling the development to remove drugs and violence from the area.

In 1998, the New York City Police Department led a five-month investigation of drug sales at the Red Hook Houses which ended in the arrest of 400 suspects, with 95 percent being residents of the houses.

Between January 1, 2013, and March 30, 2015, NYCHA tested 113 apartments for lead. Of these, 105 had positive lead tests, the highest positive-test rate of any property in the city.

Hurricane Sandy 
The city classifies Red Hook Houses as being in flood zone 1, indicating high flood risk. The storm left residents without power and fresh water for months. This caused leaks, resulting in mold that affected many residents' health. Prior to Sandy, various city reports outlined the need for increased flood protection projecting floods as high as 5 feet during storm surges yet NYCHA officials did not anticipate storm surges being that strong.

After the storm, the Federal Emergency Management Agency (FEMA) promised the Red Hook Houses the largest sum of $560 million of its $3.2 billion grant to NYCHA developments impacted. In 2017, NYCHA started to replace the roofs of all buildings for $63 million. Plans for other improvements include new electrical rooms to be above the Design Flood Elevation (DFE), a new building for boiler equipment above DFE, the installation of standby generators, flood proofing above DFE, restoration of mechanical, electrical and plumbing systems. Damaged playgrounds and the senior center will also be repaired. The heat and electricity is designed to be housed in 14 “utility pods” that would also be used as gathering place for public programs. The flood barrier is designed as a "lily pad" with raised earth in the middle of internal courtyards with an active flood wall and passive barriers. The buildings were designed by Kohn Pedersen Fox (KPF) received merits in the 2017 AIANY Design Awards. Completion is anticipated in 2022. Many residents are skeptical of these plans, citing the dysfunction of NYCHA and not addressing other quality of life concerns such as the elevators and lead paint.

In 2018, residents faced winter heat outages due to inadequate temporary boilers which were installed after Sandy.

Red Hook Initiative 
In 2002, the non-profit Red Hook Initiative (RHI) was founded in response to the health and social issues affecting public housing residents and is dedicated to youth empowerment, social justice, and sustainability.

Local Leaders 
In 2013, as a response to Hurricane Sandy, RHI launched Local Leaders, a program designed to train public housing residents about emergency preparedness and community organizing. By 2019, 250 residents have completed the 10-week course.

Red Hook Farms 
Red Hook Farms was founded in 2013 and is part of NYCHA's Building Healthy Communities (BHC) initiative. The farm is managed by RHI and residents of Red Hook Houses who are between 18 and 24 and who are members of the Green City Force (GCF) AmeriCorps build and maintain the farm.

Red Hook WiFi 
Red Hook WiFi was in the works prior Hurricane Sandy but became more important once the neighborhood was cut off from telecommunications during the storm. The network features wireless mesh to create a network. RHI trains young housing residents to become “digital stewards" who are paid to work 20 hours a week in a year-long program to teach mesh networking, video production and web design, with an internship at the end of the training.

Notable people 

 Carmelo Anthony (born 1984), athlete
 James McBride (born 1957), writer
 Matty Rich (born 1971), film director
 Shabazz the Disciple (born 1973), rapper

References

External links 

Red Hook Initiative

Public housing in Brooklyn
Red Hook, Brooklyn
New Deal in New York (state)